Ekrem Kahya (born 9 February 1978) is a Dutch football manager and former professional footballer. After beginning his professional career in 1996 with ADO Den Haag, he has since played for Denizlispor, Go Ahead Eagles, FC Dordrecht and VVV-Venlo. He re-signed for ADO Den Haag during the 2008–09 season. He played as a center midfielder.

References

External links
Player profile at Voetbal International 

1978 births
Living people
Dutch people of Turkish descent
Dutch footballers
ADO Den Haag players
Denizlispor footballers
Go Ahead Eagles players
FC Dordrecht players
VVV-Venlo players
Eredivisie players
Eerste Divisie players
Footballers from The Hague
Association football midfielders
Dutch football managers